The 18-point agreement, or the 18-point memorandum, was a list of 18 points drawn up by Sarawak, proposing terms to form Malaysia, during negotiations prior to the creation of the new federation in 1963.

A Commission of Enquiry, headed by Lord Cameron Cobbold, and The Lansdowne Committee, an inter-governmental committee, were appointed to aid in the drafting of the Malaysia Agreement. Lord Lansdowne served for Britain and Tun Abdul Razak, Deputy Prime Minister of the Federation of Malaya, served for Malaya. The 18 points were based on the Nine Cardinal Principles of the rule of the English Rajah. A similar memorandum, known as the 20-point agreement, was prepared and submitted by North Borneo. The 18-point agreement often serves as a focal point amongst those who argue that Sarawak's rights within the Federation have been eroded over time like Sabah.

18 Point Agreement

18 Point Agreement of Sarawak in Malaysia Agreement 1963 (MA63)

Supporting documents: 

MA63

IGC Report

Point 1:Religion
While there was no objection to Islam being the national religion of Malaysia, there should be no official religion in Sarawak, and the provisions relating to Islam in the present Constitution of Federation Of Malaya should not apply to Federation Of Sarawak

Point 2: Language
a. Malay should be the national language of Malaysia

b. English should be the official language of Sarawak

Point 3: Constitution
Whilst accepting that the present Constitution of the Federation of Malaya should form the basis of the Constitution of Malaysia, the Constitution of Malaysia should be a completely new document drafted and agreed in the light of a free association of states and should not be a series of amendments to a Constitution drafted and agreed by different states in totally different circumstances. A new Constitution for Federation of Sarawak was of course essential.

Point 4: Head of Nation
The Rajah of Sarawak should not be eligible for election as Head of Nation of Malaysia

Point 5: Name of Federation
"Federation Of Sarawak, Malaysia"

Point 6: Immigration Power
Control over immigration into any part of Malaysia from outside should rest with the Central Government but entry into Sarawak should also require the approval of the Sarawak Government. The Central Government should not be able to veto the entry of persons into Sarawak for Government purposes except on strictly security grounds. Sarawak should have unfettered control over the movements of persons other than those in Central Government employ from other parts of Malaysia into Sarawak.

Point 7: Right of Secession
There should be right to secede from Malaysia

Point 8: Borneanisation
Borneanisation of the public service should proceed as quickly as possible.

Point 9: British Officers
Every effort should be made to encourage British Officers to remain in the public service until their places can be taken by suitably qualified people from Sarawak.

Point 10: Citizenship
The recommendation in paragraph 148(k) of the Report of the Cobbold Commission should govern the citizenship rights in the Federation of Sarawak subject to the following amendments:

a) sub-paragraph (i) should not contain the proviso as to five years residence

b) in order to tie up with our law, sub-paragraph (ii)(a) should read "7 out of 10 years" instead of "8 out of 10 years"

c) sub-paragraph (iii) should not contain any restriction tied to the citizenship of parents – a person born in Sarawak after Malaysia must be federal citizen.

Point 11: Tariffs and Finance
Sarawak should retain control of its own finance, development and tariff, and should have the right to work up its own taxation and to raise loans on its own credit.

Point 12: Head of Government
a) The Premier should be elected by official members of Council Negri

b) There should be a proper Ministerial system in Sarawak.

Point 13: Transitional Period
This should be ten years and during such period legislative power must be left with the Federation of Sarawak by the Constitution and not be merely delegated to the Sarawak Government by the Central Government.

Point 14: Education and Health
The existing healthcare and educational system of Sarawak should be maintained and for this reason it should be under Sarawak control.

Point 15: Constitutional safeguards
No amendment modification or withdrawal of any special safeguard granted to Sarawak should be made by the Central Government without the positive concurrence of the Government of the Federation of Sarawak
The power of amending the Constitution of the Federation of Sarawak should belong exclusively to the people in the Sarawak.

Point 16: Representation in Parliament
This should take account not only of the population of Sarawak but also of its size and potentialities and in any case should not be less than that of North Borneo and Singapore.

Point 17: Name of Head of Federation
Rajah of Sarawak

Point 18: Land, Forests, Local Government, etc.
The provisions in the Constitution of the Malaysia in respect of the powers of the National Land Council should not apply in Sarawak. Likewise, the National Council for Local Government should not apply in Sarawak

See also
 20-point agreement
 Malaysia Act 1963

References

Further reading
 
 An Agreement Forged and Forgotten, Borneo Post
 The 18 Point Agreement Revisited, Borneo Post

Politics of Sarawak
History of Sarawak
Political history of Malaya
Formation of Malaysia
1963 documents